Steenburg Tavern is a historic Revolutionary War-era tavern located at Rhinecliff, Dutchess County, New York.

History
Located on the west side of Route 9, it was originally built about 1749 and expanded in the late 18th century. A 1749 map shows Joachim Radcliff living on the property; he was likely the original builder. A 1798 map indicates that it was by then a tavern owned by Benjamin van Steenburg.

Building
It is a four bay wide, two bay deep stone building built into a hillside.  It features a sweeping gable roof and broad low verandah. The overhang of the front roof, sheltering a porch is a typical Dutch feature. Also on the property is a contributing carriage barn and privy.  Originally built as a farmhouse, it was acquired as a dependency for Grasmere, as did the Benner House and Fredenburg House, by the mid-19th century.

It was added to the National Register of Historic Places in 1987.

References

Commercial buildings completed in 1755
Buildings and structures in Dutchess County, New York
Taverns in New York (state)
National Register of Historic Places in Dutchess County, New York
Taverns on the National Register of Historic Places in New York (state)